Enders Reservoir State Recreation Area (SRA) is a state recreation area in southwestern Nebraska, United States. The recreation area is managed by the Nebraska Game and Parks Commission. There are camping, fishing, swimming, and other recreational opportunities available.

References

External links
 Enders Reservoir State Recreation Area
 Nebraska Game and Parks Commission

Protected areas of Nebraska
State parks of Nebraska